Tropical Storm Krovanh, known in the Philippines as Tropical Depression Vicky, was a tropical cyclone which caused deadly flooding in the Philippines during December 2020. The 31st depression and 23rd and final named storm of the 2020 Pacific typhoon season, Krovanh originated from a tropical depression which was first monitored by PAGASA, late on December 17. The system strengthened with PAGASA naming it Vicky, meanwhile the JMA monitored it as a low pressure area. The depression then made several landfalls over the Philippines on December 18–19 before moving out of the PAR on December 20, as it strengthened into a tropical storm according to the JMA and was named Krovanh. However, Krovanh was downgraded back to a tropical depression the next day, with the JTWC issuing their final advisory on December 22.

Krovanh caused flash flooding and mudslides across the Philippines damaging numerous homes. 9 people were killed by the storm and 1 person remains missing as of December 23, 2020. Damage in the Philippines totaled to around  ₱213.2 million (US$4.48 million)

Meteorological history

The PAGASA had already recognized the system as a tropical depression and named it Vicky, however at the time, the Japan Meteorological Agency (JMA) only recognized the system as a low-pressure area. The next day, the JMA followed suit and recognized the system as a tropical depression. At 14:00 PHT (6:00 UTC), the system made landfall in Baganga, Davao Oriental. 9 hours later, it emerged off the coast of Misamis Oriental and entered the Bohol Sea, later entering the Sulu Sea on the next day at 5:00 PHT (21:00 UTC). On December 19 at 23:00 PHT (15:00 UTC), Krovanh made its second landfall over central Palawan, emerging into the South China Sea shortly after. As the storm traversed the South China Sea, the system had strengthed into a tropical storm according to the JMA as it emerged into a region of relatively favorable atmospheric conditions, thus given the name Krovanh. On December 20 at 14:00 PHT (6:00 UTC), Krovanh left the Philippine Area of Responsibility, although storm signals were still raised for the Kalayaan Islands. The PAGASA then upgraded Krovanh into a tropical storm, and issued a Signal No. 2 warning for the Kalayaan Islands. The next day, December 21, Krovanh was downgraded into a tropical depression by both the JMA and by the PAGASA in their final advisories for the storm. The JTWC then issued their final warning on Krovanh the next day shortly after most of its central convection had dissipated due to increasingly hostile wind shear.

Preparations and impact

Philippines
Large swaths of Visayas and Mindanao were placed under Signal No. 1 warnings due to Krovanh. Sea travel was subsequently suspended in the areas affected by the warnings. Roughly 10,000 people stayed in shelters. Floods and landslides were triggered in Cebu, Agusan del Sur, Davao de Oro, and in Leyte, where two senior citizens were killed in a landslide. In Lapu-Lapu City, 300 residents were forced to evacuate after 76 houses near the shore were swept into sea. Damages have been estimated to total up to ₱213.2 million (US$4.48 million). At least nine people were killed by the effects of Krovanh. At least 31,408 families were affected by the storm in the Philippines.

Malaysia
The Malaysian Meteorological Department issued an advisory for the state of Sabah, for the possibility of rough seas and gusty winds associated with Krovanh.

See also

Weather of 2020
Tropical cyclones in 2020
Typhoon Tembin (2017)
Tropical Storm Usagi (2018)

References

External links

Krovanh
2020 in the Philippines